

Dinosaurs

Newly named dinosaurs 
Data courtesy of George Olshevsky's dinosaur genera list.

Newly named birds

References 

1820s in paleontology
Paleontology